(born November 27, 1960) is a retired judoka from Japan, who represented his native country at the 1988 Summer Olympics in Seoul, South Korea. There he won the bronze medal in the men's middleweight division (– 86 kg), alongside Ben Spijkers from the Netherlands.

He was born in Nishimorokata District, Miyazaki and began judo at the age of a junior high student. He entered noble Asahi Kasei of the judo after graduation in Tenri University. In the days of active play, he was good at Seoi Nage, Tai Otoshi and Uchi Mata.

References

External links 
  Profile

Japanese male judoka
Judoka at the 1988 Summer Olympics
Olympic judoka of Japan
Olympic bronze medalists for Japan
1960 births
Living people
Place of birth missing (living people)
Olympic medalists in judo
Medalists at the 1988 Summer Olympics
20th-century Japanese people
21st-century Japanese people